Rocco Berry (born 17 May 2001) is a New Zealand professional rugby league footballer who plays as a  or er for the New Zealand Warriors in the NRL.

Background
He is the son of former All Black, Marty Berry.

Playing career

2021
Berry made his first grade debut in round 7 of the 2021 NRL season, for the New Zealand Warriors against Melbourne. Berry scored his first try in the NRL a week later against North Queensland.

2022
Berry played a total of seven games for the New Zealand club in the 2022 NRL season as they finished 15th on the table.

References

External links
New Zealand Warriors profile

2001 births
Living people
New Zealand rugby league players
New Zealand Warriors players
Rugby league centres
Rugby league players from Masterton